Marco Scherbaum (* May 6, 1974 in Ebern) is a German Entrepreneur, European Senator of Economic Affairs and Author of specialist books.

Biography 
Scherbaum completed an apprenticeship as an industrial clerk (IHK 1994) at Weigang AG in Ebern and an apprenticeship as an insurance clerk (IHK 1997) at HUK Coburg. From 2002 he was district director at Central AG Cologne in the Generali group and from 2012 to 2016 regional manager in the group of the Bavarian Insurance Chamber. In 2012 he obtained a Certified Master's degree from the DVNLP with a focus on business and health.

Marco Scherbaum is the managing director of Health for All, which he founded in 2016 as a sole shareholder. As a broker and management consultant, he specializes in collective solutions for company health insurance and company care. He is active nationwide for sustainable economic, health and personnel policy of companies, municipalities, clubs and associations. In addition, Scherbaum works as a lecturer for health economics and system worlds of German health policy.

As a European Senator for Economic Affairs, Scherbaum represents the EES Corporate Health department. He is thus a member of the Expert Council for the EU, which relies on the body in legislative procedures. Scherbaum is a member of the Federal Health Commission, in which he is involved in the design of a modern social and health system.

At the 2021 Annual General Meeting, Scherbaum was elected with 89 percent of the votes to the Supervisory Board of the European Economic Senate (EES), which has offices in Munich and Brussels.

Positions 
In a dialogue with Federal Health Minister Jens Spahn, Scherbaum discusses a position paper on the divergence of tax treatment of occupational health care expenses and calls for a separate solution for company health insurance.

As an entrepreneur and Senator for Economic Affairs, Scherbaum intervenes in current corona vaccination debates and criticizes the lack of operational setting in the vaccination strategy. As a mouthpiece for occupational physicians, private doctors and industry, he represents the interests of their associations vis-à-vis the federal government in order to coordinate those involved in occupational health and calls on policymakers to take action.

Awards 
In 2020 Scherbaum was appointed European Senator for Economic Affairs of the EMS by Ingo Friedrich (President of the European Economic Senate and Vice-President of the European Parliament). In this office he is primarily available to advise political decision-makers in order to strengthen cooperation between politics and business in Europe.

Social Engagement and private matters 
The entrepreneur has been a sponsor in the fight against cancer for years and supports projects of the Foundation Forschung hilft (Research Helps) and Hilfe im Kampf gegen Krebs e.V. (Help in the Fight Against Cancer) for the benefit of cutting-edge research at the University Hospital Würzburg. He was also an honorary judge at the Würzburg Regional Court from 2014 to 2018.

Marco Scherbaum lives in Würzburg, is married to Silvana Scherbaum and has two grown-up children.

Publications 
 Marco Scherbaum: Gesundheit für alle – Revolution der betrieblichen Gesundheitsversorgung Springer Verlag, 2019 ISBN 978-3-658-26728-5

Weblinks 
 Website of Marco Scherbaum

References 

1974 births
Living people
German politicians
German businesspeople
Health in Germany
Politicians of European nations
European Commissioners